Badminton was contested at the 1994 Asian Games in Tsuru Memorial Gymnasium, Hiroshima, Japan from October 7 to October 15, 1994.

Singles, doubles, and team events were contested for both men and women. Mixed doubles were also contested.

Medalists

Medal table

Participating nations
A total of 112 athletes from 11 nations competed in badminton at the 1994 Asian Games:

References 
New Straits Times, October 7–16, 1994
Results

External links 
 

 
1994 Asian Games events
1994
Asian Games
1994 Asian Games